The command  , an abbreviation of change owner, is used on Unix and Unix-like operating systems to change the owner of file system files, directories. Unprivileged (regular) users who wish to change the group membership of a file that they own may use .

The ownership of any file in the system may only be altered by a super-user. A user cannot give away ownership of a file, even when the user owns it. Similarly, only a member of a group can change a file's group ID to that group.

The command is available as a separate package for Microsoft Windows as part of the UnxUtils collection of native Win32 ports of common GNU Unix-like utilities. The  command has also been ported to the IBM i operating system.

See also
 chgrp
 chmod
 takeown

References

External links

 
 chown manual page
 The chown Command by The Linux Information Project (LINFO)

Operating system security
Standard Unix programs
Unix SUS2008 utilities
IBM i Qshell commands